Matthew Frederic Metzger (born March 24, 1980) is an American actor and singer.

Life and career
Metzger was born in Peoria, Illinois. He gained fame when he participated in the popular reality television series American Idol in season 3. He was eliminated from the show during the semi-final competition.

On August 23, 2004, Metzger joined the cast of the ABC soap opera, One Life to Live as Demerest "Duke" Buchanan, son of Kevin Buchanan. In late March 2006, Metzger was let go from the soap after only two years due to the storyline.  His character Duke Buchanan was killed by a tornado in May 2006.

In 2005, Metzger starred as Deke in a short horror film, Man in the Basement.

References

External links

Matthew Metzger profile from SoapCentral
Unofficial website

1980 births
American male soap opera actors
American Idol participants
Living people
Miami University alumni
People from Oxford, Ohio
People from Peoria, Illinois
21st-century American male singers
21st-century American singers